Elizabeth Coleman (born 1937) was the ninth president of Bennington College from 1987 to 2013. Coleman also served as the founding Dean of College of Arts and Sciences at The New School for Social Research.

Education 
Coleman graduated with honors from the University of Chicago, where she was a Ford Foundation Scholar, and completed her master's degree in English and American Literature at Cornell University, where she was a Woodrow Wilson Fellow. She received her Ph.D. with distinction at Columbia University, where she was a Woodbridge and President's Fellow.

Career 
Coleman began her career as a professor at Stony Brook University. She then founded the College of Arts and Sciences at The New School for Social Research, where she served as dean. She was appointed president of Bennington College in 1987, and served until her retirement in 2013. She was succeeded by Mariko Silver, a former administrator at Arizona State University and United States Department of Homeland Security official.

Personal life 
Coleman is the mother of David Coleman, a businessman and current president of the College Board.

References

External links 
 TED talk (video)

Columbia University alumni
Cornell University alumni
University of Chicago alumni
Living people
1931 births
Place of birth missing (living people)
Presidents of Bennington College